Podzamcze  is a village in the administrative district of Gmina Bychawa, within Lublin County, Lublin Voivodeship, in eastern Poland.

See also
Lublin Ghetto

References

Villages in Lublin County